Four More Years in the Bush Leagues is a 2005 album by the Capitol Steps.

Track listing
Embraceable Jew
Wouldn't It Be Hillary?
The Sunni Side of Tikrit
Someone Dumber Might
I Like Big Cuts and I Cannot Lie
There is Nothing Like Ukraine
Fakey Purple Hearts
I've Taken Stands on Both Sides Now
The Candidates' Debate
Der Nadermouth
It Don't Mean a Thing if Your State's Not a Swing
Electile Dysfunction
He Works Hard for the Country
If I Only Had a Plan
The Impossible Dean
Sunni & Cher
The Land's Not Your Land
Detective Story
The Supremes
Lirty Dies: Yubble-Doo, Bot Nush, Startha Moowurt, and Rill O'Beilly

Songs parodied
In album order:

Embraceable You
Wouldn't It Be Loverly
On the Sunny Side of the Street
Summer Nights
Baby Got Back
There is Nothing Like a Dame
Achy Breaky Heart
Both Sides Now
'O Sole Mio
It Don't Mean a Thing
She Works Hard for the Money
If I Only Had a Brain
The Impossible Dream
I Got You Babe
This Land Is Your Land
Stayin Alive

New lyrics by Bill Strauss, Elaina Newport and Mark Eaton

Production personnel
Producer: Elaina Newport
Director: Bill Strauss
Sound Engineers: Jim Smith and Greg Hammon
Pianists: Howard Breitbart, Eileen Cornett, Dave Kane, Marc Irwin, Emily Bell Spitz and Lenny Wiliams
Cassettes and CDs pressed by Lion Recording

References

Capitol Steps albums
2005 live albums
2000s comedy albums
Self-released albums
Songs about George W. Bush